Matthew Alan Young (born 6 February 2003) is an English professional footballer who plays as a midfielder for Hemel Hempstead Town on loan from EFL League Two side Leyton Orient.

Playing career
Previously a member of their academy, Young signed his first professional contract with Leyton Orient in May 2021.

Young made his debut for Orient in the 3–0 defeat at Salford City on the last day of the 2020–21 season, as an 84th minute substitute for Hector Kyprianou.

In June 2022 he joined Wealdstone on loan from Leyton Orient. He departed the club in September 2022 having not made an appearance.

Statistics

References

 

2003 births
Living people
English footballers
Association football midfielders
Leyton Orient F.C. players
Wealdstone F.C. players
English Football League players